The 1994 South Dakota State Jackrabbits football team represented South Dakota State University during the 1994 NCAA Division II football season.

Schedule

Source:

Roster

References

South Dakota State
South Dakota State Jackrabbits football seasons
South Dakota State Jackrabbits football